Achmad Nungcik Alcaff (17 August 1925 – 22 December 1992) was an Indonesian actor and film director who won the Citra Award for Best Leading Actor at the 1955 Indonesian Film Festival.

Filmography

References

External links 

 

1925 births
1992 deaths
20th-century Indonesian male actors
Indonesian film directors
People from Jambi